Garino is a rural locality (a village) in Kishertskoye Rural Settlement, Kishertsky District, Perm Krai, Russia. The population was 74 as of 2010.

Geography 
Garino is located 4 km southeast of Ust-Kishert (the district's administrative centre) by road. Ust-Kishert is the nearest rural locality.

References 

Rural localities in Kishertsky District